PT Delta Djakarta is a brewing company founded in 1932 and headquartered in Bekasi, Indonesia. The main brand is Anker, a 4.5% abv pale lager. Delta Djakarta is partially owned by San Miguel Malaysia (L) Private Limited, a subsidiary of Filipino brewery San Miguel Corporation, which owns 58,33% stake; while the government of Jakarta owns remaining 26,25% stake.

Brands
 Anker Beer
 Carlsberg
 San Miguel Beer

External links
 

Beer in Indonesia
1932 establishments in the Dutch East Indies
Manufacturing companies established in 1932
San Miguel Corporation subsidiaries
1980s initial public offerings
Companies listed on the Indonesia Stock Exchange